The  is a kofun burial mound located in the city of Gyōda, Saitama Prefecture, in the Kantō region of Japan. The tumulus was designated a National Historic Site in 1938 and re-designated as a Special National Historic Site of Japan in 2020 as part of the Sakitama Kofun Cluster.

Overview
The Nakanoyama Kofun has a total length of 79 meters, and is the third smallest tumulus in the Saitama Kofun Cluster. As with the other keyhole-shaped tumuli in this cluster, the Nakanoyama Kofun had a double moat which is presumed to be rectangular as with the other tumuli in this cluster, but this has yet to be confirmed. Archaeological excavation were performed in 1981, 1987, 1990, and 2010, indicating that it was made from the end of the 6th century to the beginning of the 7th century AD, making it the last of the keyhole-shaped tumuli to have been built in this cluster.

A grey Sue ware jar was found in an excavation of the moat, instead of the usual haniwa. This jar has a trumpet-shaped mouth and a hole in the bottom.  Although analysis showed that it was made at a kiln in Yorii, Saitama about 30 kilometers away, no other examples have been found in the Kantō region, although similar jars have been found at the Asahi Tenjinyama Kofun in Hita, Oita and at the Fushiiwasato No. 2 Tumulus in Naju, South Jeolla Province, South Korea in what was once the kingdom of Baekje. 

Overall length 79 meters
Posterior circular portion 42 meter diameter x 5.1 meter high
Anterior rectangular portion 44 meters wide x 5.4 meters high

See also
List of Historic Sites of Japan (Saitama)

References

External links

Gyoda city home page 
Museum of the Sakitama Ancient Burial Mounds 

Kofun
Archaeological sites in Japan
History of Saitama Prefecture
Gyōda
Historic Sites of Japan